Talal Al-Meshal (born 7 June 1978) is a Saudi Arabian former footballer.

Club career
A prolific striker, Al-Meshal played for Al-Ahli, Al-Nassr, Al-Ittihad, Al-Markhiya and Al-Raed. He played for Al-Ittihad at the 2008 AFC Champions League.

International career
Al-Meshal played for the Saudi Arabia national football team and was a participant at the Asian Cup 2000, where he scored 3 goals as Saudi Arabia finished as runners-up.

International goals
Scores and results list saudi Arabia's goal tally first.

References

External Links

1978 births
Living people
Saudi Arabian footballers
Saudi Arabia international footballers
2000 AFC Asian Cup players
2004 AFC Asian Cup players
Al-Ahli Saudi FC players
Al-Markhiya SC players
Al Nassr FC players
Ittihad FC players
Al-Raed FC players
Saudi First Division League players
Saudi Professional League players
Sportspeople from Jeddah
Association football forwards